Of Beauty and Rage is the fifth studio album by American Christian rock band Red. It was released on February 24, 2015 through Essential Records. It was produced by Rob Graves. The album was included through a PledgeMusic campaign. "Darkest Part" and "Yours Again" were available pre-release to backers. The album's first single "Darkest Part" was released on December 8, 2014. The album's second single, "Yours Again", was released on March 19, 2015.

Background 
According to one of the twins, Anthony Armstrong, Red's guitarist, the song, "Darkest Part", is "simply about being vulnerable. When you trust someone and show the demons you have hidden away in your life, there is a fear and likelihood of scaring someone away." The story depicted in the music video ties in with past songs "Feed the Machine" and "Perfect Life". Together they form a larger storyline.  At 60 minutes, it is the band's longest album to date.

Track listing

Personnel 

 Michael Barnes – vocals
 Anthony Armstrong – guitars, programming
 Randy Armstrong – bass, piano, vocals
 Dan Johnson – drums
 Rob Graves – piano, programming
 David Davidson – violins
 David Angell – violins
 Conni Ellisor – violins
 Karen Winkelmann – violins
 Janet Darnall – violins
 Alicia Enstrom – violins
 Monisa Angell – violas
 Elizabeth Lamb – violas
 Seanad Dunigan Chang – violas
 Anthony LaMarchina – cellos
 Sarighani Reist – cellos
 Carole Rabinowitz – cellos
 Julie Tanner – cellos
 Rob Graves – producer
 Jason McArthur – executive producer
 Jason Root – A&R Production
 Ben Grosse – mixing
 Paul Pavao – mix assistant
 Tom Baker at Baker Mastering – mastering  
 Justin Spotswood – engineering
 Cason Pratt – engineering
 Bret Autrey (as Blue Stahli) – programming
 Josh Baker – programming
 Bobby "Baeho" Shin – orchestral engineer

Charts
Of Beauty and Rage debuted on the U.S. Billboard 200 chart at No. 14 with first week sales of over 34,000.

References

External links

2015 albums
Concept albums
Red (American band) albums